Elvis Job (born 2 November 1992) is a Cameroonian footballer. He plays for Thailand's Banbueng FC.

External links

Cameroonian footballers
Expatriate footballers in Thailand
Living people
1992 births
Association football forwards
Elvis Job
Elvis Job
Elvis Job
Elvis Job